"I Live for Your Love" is a 1987 song by Natalie Cole.  It was the second of four charting singles from her 
Everlasting LP, and was also the second greatest hit from the album.

The song reached number 13 on the U.S. Billboard Hot 100 during the winter of 1988. It was a major Adult Contemporary and R&B hit, reaching number two and number four on those charts, respectively.
It was less of a hit on the Canadian pop and AC charts, and also charted minorly in the UK.

"I Live for Your Love" is Cole's longest-running chart single.  It is her only song which spent over five months on the American pop charts. Her only bigger hit on the U.S. Adult Contemporary chart was "Miss You Like Crazy", which reached number one a year later.

The single shared a B-side with its predecessor, "Jump Start".  Both songs were backed with "More Than the Stars".

Chart history

Weekly charts

Year-end charts

References

External links
 

1987 songs
1988 singles
Natalie Cole songs
Manhattan Records singles
Songs written by Pam Reswick
Contemporary R&B ballads
Pop ballads
Songs written by Steve Werfel